Kurt Wolff may refer to:

 Kurt Wolff (publisher) (1887–1963), German publisher, editor, writer and journalist
 Kurt Wolff (aviator) (1895–1917), Germany World War I fighter ace
 Kurt Heinrich Wolff (1912–2003), Jewish German-born sociologist